The Source is a 1999 documentary film directed by Chuck Workman.

Summary
The film is about the Beat Generation and its impact on the counterculture movements from the 1960s-70s onwardsand features appearances by Johnny Depp, Dennis Hopper, and John Turturro each reciting one writer's work (as with Turturro reciting Howl) to another.

Reception
The film received positive acclaim with an 88% on Rotten Tomatoes.

Gary Morris of Bright Lights Journal, however, states that the "intriguing yet shallow" documentary is less a linear biography of the movement than a kind of "Beat chic" sampler.

See also
 Howl-2010 film starring James Franco as Ginsberg
 United States in the 1950s
On the Road-2012 adaptation of Kerouac's magnum opus

References

External links

1999 films
Films about the Beat Generation
Documentary films about writers
Films directed by Chuck Workman